The UCLA Film & Television Archive is a visual arts organization focused on the preservation, study, and appreciation of film and television, based at the University of California, Los Angeles (UCLA).

Also a nonprofit exhibition venue, the archive screens over 400 films and videos a year, primarily at the Billy Wilder Theater, located inside the Hammer Museum in Westwood, California. (Formerly, it screened films at the James Bridges Theater on the UCLA campus). The archive is funded by UCLA, public and private interests, and the entertainment industry. It is a member of the International Federation of Film Archives.

The Archive is a division of the UCLA Library. As of January 2021, its collection hosted more than 500,000 items, including approximately 159,000 motion picture titles and 132,000 television titles, more than 27 million feet of newsreels, more than 222,000 broadcast recordings and more than 9,000 radio transcription discs.

History 
The Archive hosted virtual screenings in lieu of its in-person presentations during the COVID-19 pandemic.

The Archive appointed its fourth director in January 2021. She was the first woman and person of color in the role.

The collection
The Archive has hosted its collection in a Stoa building in Santa Clarita, California since 2015. It shares the facilities with the Packard Humanities Institute. The building was funded and built to the specification of David Woodley Packard.

The archive's holdings include 35mm collections from ViacomCBS/Paramount Pictures, Disney/20th Century Studios, WarnerMedia/Warner Bros., Sony/Columbia Pictures, New World Pictures, Orion Pictures, MGM, United Artists, NBCUniversal/Universal Pictures, RKO and Republic Pictures. Additional film donations have been made by the Academy of Motion Picture Arts and Sciences, the American Film Institute, and the Directors Guild of America as well as such figures including Hal Ashby, Tony Curtis, Charlton Heston, Orson Welles, Rock Hudson, Jeff Chandler, Radley Metzger, Richard Conte, Audie Murphy, John McIntire, John Wayne, Fred MacMurray and William Wyler. It also holds the entire Hearst Metrotone News Library. The archive is also known for holding over 300 kinescope prints from the now-defunct DuMont Television Network. The archive also holds restored prints of Paramount Pictures' cartoon library. Much of the Archive's collection is available for onsite research by appointment at the Archive's Research & Study Center (ARSC), located on the UCLA campus in Powell Library. ARSC clients often go to the UCLA Media Lab (Room 270) to view their media.

Billy Wilder Theater
The Billy Wilder Theater is on the courtyard level of the Hammer Museum. Made possible by a $5 million gift from Audrey L. Wilder and designed by Michael Maltzan Architecture, the 295-seat Billy Wilder Theater is the home of the archive's cinematheque and of the Hammer's public programs, which includes artists’ lectures, literary readings, musical concerts, and public conversations.. The theater, which cost $7.5 million to complete, is one of the few in the country where audiences may watch the entire spectrum of moving images in their original formats: from the earliest silent films requiring variable speed projection to the most current digital cinema and video.

See also
Packard Humanities Institute

References

External links
 UCLA Film & Television Archive website

Film archives in the United States
Film preservation organizations
Television archives in the United States
Film
Cinema of Southern California
FIAF-affiliated institutions